Fantastica is a 1980 French-Canadian musical film directed by Gilles Carle. It was entered into the 1980 Cannes Film Festival. An English-language dialogue dubbed version of the film was broadcast on Superchannel, a pay-TV channel in western Canada in the early 1980s.

Cast

Soundtrack album
Released in 1980 by Acapella Beaubec Musique, the album's catalogue number is AC-108. The French pressing's catalogue number is RSL-1085. All songs composed by Lewis Furey, and arranged by John Lissauer. The album is produced by Lewis Furey and John Lissauer. The lyrics were printed on the inner sleeve. The album was reissued in 2005 on CD by Mantra Records (Mantra 020 WM 330) in France only.
	
Side one
 Fantastica (Theme generique) [1:32]
 Funny Funny [2:30]
 Be My Baby Tonight [3:28]
 This Could Have Been The Song [3:38]
 Fantastica [3:12]
 Goodbye Love [2:27]

Side two
 What's Wrong With Me [3:24]
 Happy's In Town [3:16]
 Lorca In Three Movements [9:27]
 This Could Have Been The Song (piano duo) [2:55]

Reception
The film was seen by 116,885 people in France.

References

Works cited

External links

1980 films
1980s musical films
Canadian musical films
French musical films
1980s French-language films
Films directed by Gilles Carle
French-language Canadian films
1980s Canadian films